The Ambassador of Australia to Portugal is an officer of the Australian Department of Foreign Affairs and Trade and the head of the Embassy of the Commonwealth of Australia to the Portuguese Republic. The ambassador resides in Lisbon. The ambassador also holds non-resident accreditation for Cabo Verde (since 2009), São Tomé and Príncipe (since 2009) and Guinea-Bissau (since March 2011).

From 1946 to 1970, Australia's relations with Portugal were handled by the Consulate in Portuguese Timor.

The current ambassador, since September 2022, is Indra McCormick.

List of heads of mission

Notes 
: Also served as non-resident Ambassador of Australia to the Republic of Cabo Verde, since 2009.
: Also served as non-resident Ambassador of Australia to the Democratic Republic of São Tomé and Príncipe, since 2009. 
: Also served as non-resident Ambassador of Australia to the Republic of Guinea-Bissau, since March 2011.

References

External links

Australian Embassy, Portugal – Cabo Verde, São Tomé and Príncipe and Guinea-Bissau

 
 
 
 
Portugal
Australia